Tribes of Redwall Mice was published in 2003 as an accessory to the Redwall series by Brian Jacques. It was illustrated by Jonathan Walker.

This booklet about mice in the Redwall series features trivia questions, a giant poster, and profiles of many of the mouse characters in the series, including Martin the Warrior.

References

2003 children's books
2003 fantasy novels
Redwall books